Haykota is a small town in the western Gash-Barka region of Eritrea.

Overview
The town is situated near the location of a monument erected to memorialize Hamid Idris Awate, the man who started the Eritrean War of Independence.

Economy
A dairy co-op that was built in the town plays a significant part in the local economy.

References

Haykota, Eritrea

Gash-Barka Region
Populated places in Eritrea